Jonathan Hales (born 10 May 1937) is a British playwright and screenwriter. He is noted for his work with Lucasfilm, including The Young Indiana Jones Chronicles television series and Star Wars: Episode II – Attack of the Clones.

Career
Hales has worked extensively in the theatre (both as actor and stage director), film and television.  He began his screenwriting career in 1970, with the British television series Manhunt. Hales has written for the American series Dallas, as well as many iterations — series and DVD releases — of The Adventures of Young Indiana Jones.

In 1977 he directed the stage play Mecca by E. A. Whitehead at the Open Space Theatre, London.

Hales wrote the 1980 Agatha Christie film The Mirror Crack'd. He is credited with the story for the 2002 prequel to The Mummy, The Scorpion King, and is co-author (with George Lucas) of the screenplay for 2002's Star Wars film Star Wars: Episode II – Attack of the Clones.

Writing the middle film in the Star Wars prequel trilogy,  Lucas and Hales continued to refine their script as production began. The production draft was completed less than a week before commencement of principal photography. Hales worked with Lucas as costumes were designed and sets were constructed. “At that stage, Attack of the Clones felt like a ‘virtual film’ because we got the script only three days before we started shooting,” recalls producer Rick McCallum. “We had to build these sets to a script that didn’t exist.”

Screenwriting filmography

Films

TV Series

References

External links
 
Star Wars Episode II, Official Production Notes www.culture.com, Author : ©2002 Lucasfilm Ltd.
 "Jonathan Hales joins Episode II Development", archived from Starwars.com

British male screenwriters
British dramatists and playwrights
1937 births
Living people
British male dramatists and playwrights
Lucasfilm people